The 2013 Booker Prize for Fiction was awarded on 15 October 2013 to Eleanor Catton for her novel The Luminaries. A longlist of thirteen titles was announced on 23 July, and these were narrowed down to a shortlist of six titles, announced on 10 September. The jury was chaired by Robert Macfarlane, who was joined by Robert Douglas-Fairhurst, Natalie Haynes, Martha Kearney, and Stuart Kelly. The shortlist contained great geographical and ethnic diversity, with Zimbabwean-born NoViolet Bulawayo, Eleanor Catton of New Zealand, Jim Crace from England, Indian American Jhumpa Lahiri, Canadian-American Ruth Ozeki and Colm Tóibín of Ireland.

Judging panel
On 21 November 2012, it was announced that Robert Macfarlane would chair the panel of judges that would decide the winner of the 2013 award. Macfarlane declared that he felt "very proud indeed to be chairing this prize, which has done so much to shape the modern literary landscape." On 17 December, he was joined by four other judges: biographer and critic Robert Douglas-Fairhurst, writer and broadcaster Natalie Haynes, journalist Martha Kearney, and writer, critic and reviewer Stuart Kelly. "Part of the reason the prize is heralded internationally", the announcement read, "is because the judges stand as a guarantee of literary weight and seriousness of intent." The judges' backgrounds – as academics, professional writers and journalists – were emphasized as essential to their role as reviewers. "We are all looking forward to the 10 months, 140 novels and many meetings and conversations that lie ahead of us," Macfarlane said, "as we search for the very best of contemporary fiction."

Nominees (shortlist)
NoViolet Bulawayo for We Need New Names through Chatto & Windus
Eleanor Catton for The Luminaries through Granta
Jim Crace for Harvest through Picador
Jhumpa Lahiri for The Lowland through Bloomsbury Publishing
Ruth Ozeki for A Tale for the Time Being through Canongate
Colm Tóibín for The Testament of Mary through Viking Press

Nominees (longlist)

Winner
On 15 October, the chair of the judges Robert Macfarlane announced that the winner of the 2013 Man Booker Prize was New Zealand author Eleanor Catton for her second novel  The Luminaries. By winning, Catton became, at the age of 28, the youngest author ever to win the Booker. She was previously, at the age of 27, the youngest author ever to be shortlisted for the Man Booker Prize. At 832 pages, The Luminaries is also the longest work to win the prize in its 45-year history.

Catton is the second writer from New Zealand to win the prize, the first being Keri Hulme in 1985 with The Bone People. The judges' final decision was made after around two hours of discussion. Of The Luminaries, Macfarlane commented "It's a dazzling work. It's a luminous work. It is vast without being sprawling." Catton was presented with the prize by the Duchess of Cornwall at Guildhall in London. As winner, Catton also received award money to the sum of £50,000.

See also
 List of winners and shortlisted authors of the Booker Prize for Fiction

References

Man Booker
Booker Prizes by year
2013 awards in the United Kingdom